is a Japanese voice actress and singer from Kanagawa Prefecture who is affiliated with Aoni Production. After winning an audition in 2012, she began her entertainment activities in 2013 with the release of the song "Kimi to Futari" which she sang with Yurika Endō. That same year, she played her first role as Yui Natsukawa in the anime television series Ace of Diamond. She is also known for her roles as Nono Morikubo in The Idolmaster Cinderella Girls, Sasame Mitsukuri in Ongaku Shōjo, and Haru Soramachi in Between the Sky and Sea. From 2013 to 2016, she was a member of the music group Trefle.

Biography
Takahashi was born in Kanagawa Prefecture on September 9, 1994. She had been interested in songs used in anime since the age of four, when under the influence of her grandfather, she would listen to music from Inuyasha and Cardcaptor Sakura. While in elementary school, she wanted to become a lawyer as she had become fond of watching crime drama series on television, but later on decided to pursue an entertainment-related career instead. When she was 17, she participated in a voice acting audition held by the media company Pony Canyon; she would become the audition's winner, beating numerous other participants.

Takahashi's first activity as an entertainer was the release of the song , which she performed together with fellow newcomer Yurika Endō as the duo Yuri*Kari; the song was used as the ending theme to the 2013 anime television series The Severing Crime Edge. That same year, she made her voice acting debut as the character Yui Natsukawa in the anime series Ace of Diamond.

In 2017, Takahashi announced that she had graduated from Rikkyo University. That same year, she was cast as Nono Morikubo in The Idolmaster Cinderella Girls. She was also cast as the character Haru Soramachi in the mobile game Between the Sky and Sea, where she, Honoka Inoue, and Momoko Suzuki would perform the game's theme song . In 2018, she was cast as Sasame Mitsukuri in Ongaku Shōjo, and she would reprise the role of Haru for the anime television series adaptation of Between the Sky and Sea.

In 2022, Takahashi tested positive for COVID-19.

Filmography

Anime
2013
 Ace of Diamond as Yui Natsukawa

2015
 My Love Story!! as Female student
 Lance 'N Masques (episode 6)

2017
 The Idolmaster Cinderella Girls Theater as Nono Morikubo

2018
 Ongaku Shōjo as Sasame Mitsukuri
 Between the Sky and Sea as Haru Soramachi

2019
Dr. Stone as Suika

2020
Assault Lily Bouquet as Miriam Hildegard von Gropius

2021
Gunma-chan as Gunma-chan
Assault Lily Fruits as Miriam Hildegard von Gropius

2022
Do It Yourself!! as Shii
Chainsaw Man as Kobeni Higashiyama

Anime films
Gridman Universe (2023) as The 2nd

Video games
 Dengeki Bunko Fighting Climax (2014) as Zero
 Between the Sky and Sea (2017) as Haru Soramachi
Fate/Grand Order (2020) as Van Gogh
Xenoblade Chronicles: Definitive Edition (2020) as Teelan
Granblue Fantasy (2021) as Lich
Uma Musume Pretty Derby (2021) as Kawakami Princess
Super Robot Wars 30 (2021) as Lian Ambird
Alchemy Stars (2022) as Kayano
D4DJ (2022) as Lumina Ichihoshi

References

External links 
Official agency profile 

1994 births
Living people
Aoni Production voice actors
Japanese video game actresses
Japanese voice actresses
Rikkyo University alumni
Voice actresses from Kanagawa Prefecture
21st-century Japanese people